The Long Beach Public Library  is the public library of Long Beach, New York, serving  the civic, cultural, educational and recreational needs of the community. The central library has two branches: one in Point Lookout, New York and the other at the West End of Long Beach, off New York Ave.

History 

The Long Beach Public Library  was founded in 1928 and had its first site at 124 West Park Avenue. The original site has been declared a landmark by the Long Beach Historical Society just above the popular Sutton Place Bar and Grill. in 2018 the owners of Sutton Place destroyed the original library. 

The first year the Library was open, more than 2000 people registered for library cards. Seven years later the Library needed a bigger space so it moved its location near the Long Island Railroad. Although the space was bigger, many patrons complained about noise, so a new location was needed.

The library moved to its current three floor building in 1954. In 1997, the Library underwent a major renovation.

Damage from Hurricane Sandy in late October 2012 closed the main library until the following March. The much smaller West End branch remained closed.

Special features

Youth Services Department 
The Long Beach Public Library is expanding the traditional role of library services; Family Place Libraries are centers of early childhood information, parent education, emergent literacy, socialization, and support for families with children from birth through high school. Long Beach is one of 26 Family Place Libraries on Long Island and 122 communities in 22 states.

The following is a list of storytimes that the Long Beach Public Library offers:

Wiggles and Giggles Tummy Time Program
(1 month to 5months w/ caregiver)
Use rattles, board books, soft stuffed "Elmo's", feathers and face to face on the tummy play with your baby to encourage babies development with the support of other parents of babies who do not want to force their baby on his/her tummy despite recommendations from doctors that babies spend part of every day on their tummy to help develop strong neck and trunk muscles.

Mother Goose Rhyme Time Lapsit Program
(5 to 19 months - w/caregivers)
Using songs, fingerplays and Mother Goose rhymes, this program is a great opportunity for parents to bond with their baby. Through the repetition of songs and rhymes, children are started on the road to reading readiness in a fun and loving way. Program runs for five consecutive weeks.

Parent /Child Workshop(1 year to 3 years - w/caregivers)
Designed for both the parent and the child, this workshop introduces parents to the library and affords them the opportunity to network with other parents and gives them access to early childhood organizations and professionals in a friendly environment. Children are introduced to a wide variety of educational toys and have the opportunity to spend one-on-one time with their parent. Children may only take this class once. Program runs for six weeks.

Library Playland(1year to 3½ years-w/caregiver)
In response to parents request for an expanded Parent/Child Workshop we've created Library Play Land for children that have already completed the workshop. Using the same toys and environment that the child previously enjoyed and with an expanded circle time everyone really enjoys this relaxing play time.

Babywise Storytime
(1 year 7months - 2 years 5 months w/caregiver)
This program introduces young children and parents to storytime through the use of fingerplays, songs, stories and a simple craft. Parents (or caregivers) are encouraged to actively participate and interact
so that the children learn and have fun. Program runs for five weeks.

Toddler Time Storytime(2 years 6 months - 3 years 5 months w/caregiver)
A step up from Babywise, this structured program is filled with activities that develop children's coordination, motor and listening skills. Children also perform movement activities and a craft which teaches important concepts. A parent or caregiver must attend with child. Program runs for five weeks

Bilingual Storytime(3 years - 6 years)
Presented in English and Spanish. This storytime is for those who are interested in exposing their children to the Spanish language. It is also suitable for those children learning English as a second language. Children will hear stories, sing songs and view short videos in both languages. They will also do a simple craft.
Program runs for four weeks.

Preschool Storytime
(3 years-6 months to 6 years)
Each week children will enjoy stories, learn new songs, poetry, and movement activities
all focused on a specific theme, and centered on an early literacy development skill.
Available at all Library Locations

Book Discussions: Mother-Daughter girls in 4th grade and up and their moms read and discuss a great book every month.

Classes and programs

Live Homework Help: Live Tutors for Children and Adults:
Children in grades k–12, college students, and adult learners can work with live tutors between 2-10pm; 7 days a week from home or in the Library. Students working from home need a PC and their library barcode. This Service is free. Patrons can click on the LIVE HOMEWORK HELP icon on the Library's main webpage.

Tutors work with students, one at a time, in English or Spanish va a chat box and a white board.  There is no time limit per session.
Subjects include English, Math, Science and Social Studeies and study for standardized tests for K–12. Help is available for Science Fair, final exams and entrance exams. All tutorials are based on New York State Education department curriculum.

Book sales

The library has a continuous Book Sale occurring on the library's Main Floor. The library accepts donations of books, tapes/CDs, old maps, old postcards, children's books, and magazines.

References 

(1) Long Beach Herald; July 8, 2003

External links 
 Long Beach Public Library (Official Website)

Long Beach, New York
Public libraries in New York (state)
Buildings and structures in Nassau County, New York
Library buildings completed in 1954